Clostridium gasigenes is a psychrophilic bacterium from the genus Clostridium which has been isolated from lamb meat in New Zealand.

References

 

Bacteria described in 2000
gasigenes